Wiley Interdisciplinary Reviews: Computational Molecular Science is a peer-reviewed scientific journal, published since 2011 by John Wiley & Sons. In six issues per year, it provides a forum for high-quality review-type articles that are broadly accessible to a diverse audience of scientists and engineers. The 2020 impact factor is 25.113.

The current Editor-in-Chief is Peter R. Schreiner from the Justus-Liebig-University, Germany.

References

External links

Chemistry journals
Wiley (publisher) academic journals
English-language journals
Publications established in 2011